Troy Dale Jackson (born June 26, 1968) is an American logger and politician from Allagash, Maine currently serving as president of the Maine Senate. Jackson represents Maine Senate District 1, representing northern Aroostook County, including the towns of Fort Kent, Madawaska and Caribou. Jackson has served as Senate President since 2018.

Jackson started in politics during the 1998 logging blockade along the Quebec border, protesting the illegal hiring of Canadian workers over Maine loggers, inadequate wages and poor working conditions. Eventually, Jackson was elected to the Maine House of Representatives, where he served three terms before being elected to the Maine Senate in 2008. After Democrats gained the majority in the 2018 election, Jackson was chosen to be Senate President. He has also served as Senate Majority Leader, Senate Minority Leader and now Senate President. As Senate President, he is first in line to be Governor of Maine in the event of a vacancy.

Career
Jackson first ran for the Maine House of Representatives in 2000 for Maine House District 151, as a Republican, and lost to Marc E. Michaud, Democrat. He was elected to House 151 in 2002 as an Independent, defeating incumbent Michaud. in 2004, after Maine's post census legislative redistricting, Jackson won a resounding reelection for House District 1, against Paul Berube, by a margin of 3,486 to 1,248 In 2008 Jackson ran and won Maine State Senate District 35. In December 2012, Jackson was elected Assistant Majority Leader of the State Senate after the Democrats regained control of the body. On July 10, 2013, Jackson was elected Majority Leader of the Maine Senate after the resignation of fellow Democrat Seth Goodall.

On July 1, 2013, following incumbent Democratic Congressman Mike Michaud's decision to explore running for Governor, Jackson announced he would run for Maine's 2nd congressional district, which had been Michaud's seat since 2003. On June 10, 2014, Jackson lost the primary to fellow State Senator Emily Cain.

On January 25, 2015, Jackson was elected as a member of the Democratic National Committee.

In November 2016, Jackson was re-elected to the Senate and a week later he was chosen by his fellow Democrats to be the Senate Minority Leader.

During the 2016 presidential election, Jackson was a prominent supporter of U.S. Senator from Vermont Bernie Sanders' campaign and cast his superdelegate vote for him at the 2016 Democratic National Convention. He was chosen to introduce Sanders at a campaign rally before 8,000 supporters in Portland, Maine on July 6, 2015.

During the 2020 presidential election, Jackson again supported Sanders, and again addressed a Portland rally for Sanders on September 1, 2019. After the primaries, Jackson threw his support behind Vice President Joe Biden and Senator Kamala Harris.

Politics
He is an advocate for health care and workers rights, especially for fellow loggers. In 2010, Jackson wrote a bill which would have "prohibited the Maine Department of Conservation from employing foreign laborers at state-owned logging sites". It passed both the House of Representatives and the State Senate before being vetoed by Governor Paul LePage. LePage questioned the bill's constitutionality while Jackson said that LePage was favoring large Canadian logging corporations over American workers.

In June 2013, Jackson called LePage "obstructionist" and "delusional" regarding discussions about the 2013-2014 state budget. LePage responded by saying that Jackson "claims to be for the people but he’s the first one to give it to the people without providing Vaseline", as well as saying Jackson had a "black heart".

Personal
Jackson attended Allagash Consolidated Community High School before obtaining an A.A. in business from the University of Maine at Fort Kent. He lives in Allagash, Maine.

References

External links
 Campaign website
 Legislative website

|-

1968 births
21st-century American politicians
American loggers
Living people
Maine Democrats
Maine Republicans
Maine Independents
Majority leaders of the Maine Senate
Members of the Maine House of Representatives
Minority leaders of the Maine Senate
People from Aroostook County, Maine
Presidents of the Maine Senate
University of Maine at Fort Kent alumni